The Pallava script or Pallava Grantha, is a Brahmic script, named after the Pallava dynasty of South India, attested since the 4th century AD. As epigrapher Arlo Griffiths makes clear, however, the term is misleading as not all of the relevant scripts referred to have a connection with the Pallava dynasty. He instead advocates that these scripts be called 'late Southern Brāhmī' scripts. In India, Pallava script evolved into the Tamil and Grantha script. Pallava spread to Southeast Asia and evolved into local scripts such as Balinese, Baybayin, Javanese, Kawi, Khmer, Lanna, Lao, Mon–Burmese, New Tai Lue alphabet, Sundanese, and the Thai

A proposal to encode the script in Unicode was submitted in 2018.

History
During the rule of Pallavas, the script accompanied priests, monks, scholars and traders into Southeast Asia. Pallavas developed the Pallava script based on the Tamil-Brahmi. The main characteristics of the newer script are aesthetically matched and fuller consonant glyphs. Similar to Pallava script, also visible in the writing systems of Chalukya, Kadamba, Vengi at the time of Ikshvakus. Brahmi design was slightly different of the scripts of Cholas, Pandyas and Cheras. Pallava script is the first significant developments of Brahmi in India, by combining rounded and rectangular strokes and adding typographical effects, and was suitable for civic and religious inscriptions. Kadamba-Pallava script evolved into early forms of Kannada and Telugu scripts. Glyphs become more rounded and incorporate loops because of writing upon leaves and paper.

Characteristics
The form shown here is based on examples from the 7th century AD. Letters labeled * have uncertain sound value, as they have little occurrence in Southeast Asia.

Consonants
Each consonant has an inherent /a/, which will be sounded if no vowel sign is attached. If two consonants follow one another without intervening vowel, the second consonant is made into a subscript form, and attached below the first.

Independent Vowels

Unicode
Not yet added to unicode but proposals have been made.

Examples

References

Bibliography
Sivaramamurti, C, Indian Epigraphy and South Indian Scripts. Bulletin of the Madras Government Museum. Chennai 1999

External links
 

4th-century introductions
Obsolete writing systems
Brahmic scripts
Pallava dynasty